Forensic and Scientific Services (FSS) is part of Queensland Health and provides specialist scientific and medical analysis and independent expert advice in the state of Queensland, Australia. It is sometimes referred to as the John Tonge Centre.

Services
Forensic and Scientific Services are part of the government response to threats to public health, threats to the environment, epidemics, civil emergencies, criminal investigations and coroners' inquiries into reportable deaths. Additionally they provide services to private and public sector clients in forensics, public health and environmental science. Services include: 
 Police services 
DNA profiling, 
identification of deceased persons, 
Forensic chemistry services including blood alcohol and drug analysis, 
evidence examinations and reporting
clandestine laboratory analysis.
 Forensic and Coronial services 
Autopsy to determine cause and circumstances of death, 
Mortuary, counselling services to bereaved families, coronial pathology and toxicology services and investigation of sudden or suspicious death. These services are located in the John Tonge Centre.
forensic testing for alcohol and drugs
advice on human ethics and tissue donation.
Clinical Forensic Medicine
examinations and treatment of victims and alleged perpetrators of crime.
Public and Environmental Health
 Inorganic Chemistry analyse metals and elements in environmental samples such as water, soil, sediment, food, blood, urine and other biological tissues.
 Organic Chemistry provide testing, analysis and advice on a range of issues including: residues and contaminants, algal identification, food testing, molecular and chemical testing, air monitoring.
 Radiation and Nuclear Sciences provide radiation science-based solutions including advisory and measurement services, radiation surveys and sample collection, baseline mapping, surveillance and monitoring programs, calibration of measuring instruments, regulatory surveillance monitoring, investigation and reporting on radiation incidents.
 Microbiology provide investigations, analysis, molecular epidemiology, diagnostic services and advice on bacterial outbreaks in food and water. The Public Health Microbiology laboratories also house the Leptospirosis and bacterial pathogens reference libraries.
 Virology provide diagnostic and references services for viral and rickettsial diseases such as Coronavirus, Zika virus, Measles, Dengue fever, Norovirus and Influenza.

Research and development
The research and development undertaken at FSS is focused into two areas: Public and Environmental Health and Forensic Sciences.

Forensic and Scientific Services have an extensive collection of reference and clinical samples. External researchers can apply to access coronial and non-coronial biological data

References in the media
Forensic and Scientific Services is often, and incorrectly, referred to by news media as the John Tonge Centre. The John Tonge Centre refers specifically to the mortuary.

See also
Health and Food Sciences Precinct, Coopers Plains

References

External links
 Queensland Health
 Queensland Health, Forensic and Scientific Services
 Forensic and Scientific Services Annual research report
 Careers at Forensic and Scientific Services

1989 establishments in Australia
Medical and health organisations based in Queensland
Buildings and structures in Brisbane
Government agencies of Queensland